is a Japanese footballer who plays as a defender for  club Yokohama FC.

Career statistics

Club
.

Notes

References

External links

2001 births
Living people
Japanese footballers
Association football defenders
J1 League players
J3 League players
FC Tokyo players
FC Tokyo U-23 players
Yokohama FC players